Franco Ribaudo (born November 23, 1959) is an Italian politician. He is an elected member of the Chamber of Deputies and belongs to the Democratic Party of Italy.

Biography 

He initially belonged to the FGCI and later got involved with the CGIL in the province of  Palermo.

In 1994 he became a member of the provincial council of the province of Palermo for the  Alliance of Progressives list. 
.

In the 2008 municipal elections, he was elected mayor of Marineo.

At the general election of 2013 he was elected to the Chamber of Deputies in the list of the Democratic Party in the  Sicily 1 district.

References 

 Translated in part from the  corresponding article in the Italian Wikipedia.

External links 
 "Franco Ribaudo" at the Chamber of Deputies of Italy

1959 births
Living people
Politicians from the Province of Palermo
Democratic Party (Italy) politicians
Deputies of Legislature XVII of Italy
Mayors of places in Sicily